The Fellowship of the British Academy consists of world-leading scholars and researchers in the humanities and social sciences. A varying number of fellows are elected each year in July at the Academy's annual general meeting.

2022
On 22 July 2022, the following were elected to the fellowship; 52 fellows, 29 corresponding fellows, and 4 honorary fellows.

Fellows

 Professor David M. Anderson, University of Warwick
 Professor Susan Banducci, University of Exeter
 Professor Richard Bellamy, University College London
 Professor Barbara Bombi, University of Kent
 Professor Benjamin Bowling, King's College London
 Professor Richard Bradley, London School of Economics and Political Science
 Professor Theresa Buckland, University of Roehampton
 Professor Simon Burgess, University of Bristol
 Professor Quassim Cassam, University of Warwick
 Professor Virginia Cox, Trinity College, Cambridge
 Professor Jacqueline Coyle-Shapiro, London School of Economics and Political Science
 Professor Daniel Freeman, University of Oxford
 Dr Melanie Giles FSA, University of Manchester
 Professor Simon Gilson, University of Oxford and Magdalen College, Oxford
 Professor Lucy Green, Institute of Education, University College London
 Professor Edith Hall, University of Durham
 Professor Penny Harvey, University of Manchester
 Professor Rik Henson, University of Cambridge
 Professor Pat Hudson, Cardiff University
 Professor Cristina Iannelli, University of Edinburgh
 Professor Ian Jewitt, Nuffield College, Oxford
 Professor Andrew Jordan, University of East Anglia 
 Professor Heonik Kwon, Trinity College, Cambridge
 Professor Anna Lawson, University of Leeds
 Professor Sally Maitlis, University of Oxford
 Professor Robin Mansell FAcSS, London School of Economics and Political Science
 Professor Nicola Miller, University College London
 Professor Anthony Milton, University of Sheffield
 Professor Upamanyu Pablo Mukherjee, Warwick University
 Professor Henry Overman, London School of Economics
 Professor Hilary Owen, University of Oxford and University of Manchester 
 Professor Andrew Peacock FSA, University of St Andrews
 Professor Cathy Price FRS, FMedSci, University College London
 Professor Rebecca Probert, University of Exeter
 Professor Jonathan Rigg, University of Bristol
 Professor Eleanor Robson, University College London
 Professor Kathryn M. Rudy FRSE, University of St Andrews
 Professor Valerie Rumbold, University of Birmingham
 Professor Monika Schmid, University of York
 Professor Uta Schönberg, University College London 
 Professor Marie Louise Stig Sørensen FSA, University of Cambridge
 Professor Michael Squire, King's College London
 Professor Catherine Steel, University of Glasgow 
 Professor David Storey OBE, University of Sussex Business School
 Revd Professor John Swinton FRSE, RMN, RNMD, University of Aberdeen
 Professor Sylvia Walby OBE, FAcSS, FRSA, City, University of London
 Professor David Willis, University of Oxford
 Professor Jane Wills, University of Exeter 
 Professor Emma Wilson, University of Cambridge
 Professor Andrew Wood FRHS, Durham University
 Professor Linda Woodhead MBE, King's College, London
 Professor Mark Wynn, University of Oxford.

Corresponding fellows

 Professor Rustom Bharucha, Jawaharlal Nehru University
 Professor Timothy Brook, University of British Columbia 
 Professor Linda Chisholm, University of Johannesburg 
 Professor Daniel Chua, The University of Hong Kong
 Professor Dr Irene de Jong, University of Amsterdam
 Professor Dr Mayke de Jong, Utrecht University
 Professor Dr Mamadou Diawara, Goethe University of Frankfurt
 Professor Jennifer Eberhardt,  Stanford University
 Professor Barry Eichengreen, University of California, Berkeley
 Professor Suraiya Faroqhi, Ibn Haldun University
 Professor Simon Gikandi, Princeton University
 Professor Andre Gingrich, Austrian Academy of Sciences
 Professor Evelyn Goh, The Australian National University
 Professor Sari Hanafi, American University of Beirut
 Professor Mireille Hildebrandt, Vrije Universiteit and Radboud University
 Professor Victoria Kahn, University of California, Berkeley
 Professor Dr Pauline Kleingeld, University of Groningen
 Professor Ann Langley FRSC, HEC Montréal and Warwick Business School
 Professor Margaret Levi, Stanford University
 Professor Diana Liverman, University of Arizona
 Professor Deborah Mayo, Virginia Tech
 Professor Chika Okeke-Agulu, Princeton University 
 Professor Shanti Pappu, Sharma Centre for Heritage Education and Krea University
 Professor Daniel Potts, New York University
 Professor Wlodek Rabinowicz, Lund University
 Professor John Rickford, Stanford University
 Professor Issa Shivji, University of Dar-Es-Salaam
 Professor Kathryn Tanner, Yale University Divinity School
 Professor Amy Stuart Wells, Columbia University.

Honorary fellows

 Professor Dame Anne Johnson, Professor of Infectious Disease Epidemiology, Co-Director UCL Health of the Public; President, UK Academy of Medical Sciences
 Bronwen Maddox, Director, Institute for Government; incoming Director, Chatham House
 Professor David Olusoga, Professor of Public History, University of Manchester
 Professor Benjamin Zephaniah, Professor of Poetry and Creative Writing, Brunel University; Visiting Professor, De Montfort University

2021
On 22 July 2021, the following were elected to the fellowship; 84 fellows, 29 corresponding fellows, and 3 honorary fellows.

Fellows

 Professor Laura Bear, London School of Economics and Political Science
 Professor Duncan Bell, University of Cambridge
 Professor Jean-Pierre BenoÎt, London Business School
 Professor Catherine Boone, London School of Economics and Political Science
 Professor Timothy T. Clark, British Museum
 Professor Joanne Conaghan, FAcSS, University of Bristol
 Professor Davina Cooper, King's College London
 Professor Julia Crick, King's College London
 Professor David Edgerton, King's College London
 Professor Catharine Edwards, University of London
 Professor Adrian Favell, University of Leeds
 Professor Charles Forsdick, University of Liverpool
 Professor Becky Francis, The Education Endowment Foundation
 Professor Sarah Franklin, FRSB, FAcSS, University of Cambridge
 Professor Julian Franks, London Business School
 Professor Anne Gerritsen, University of Warwick
 Professor David Gillborn, FAcSS, FRSA, University of Birmingham
 Professor Elaine Graham, University of Chester
 Professor Andrew Hadfield, University of Sussex
 Professor John Haldon, University of Birmingham
 Professor Anne Haour, University of East Anglia
 Professor Vernon Henderson, London School of Economics and Political Science
 Professor David Hesmondhalgh, University of Leeds
 Professor Ben Highmore, University of Sussex
 Professor Anders Holmberg, Newcastle University
 Professor Richard Holton, University of Cambridge
 Professor Gregory Hutchinson, University of Oxford
 Professor David Knights, Lancaster University
 Professor Susanne Kord, University College London
 Professor Jouni Kuha, London School of Economics and Political Science
 Professor Li Wei, FAcSS, MAE, University College London
 Professor Samuel Lieu, FAHA, FRSN, FHKAH (Hon), FSA, FRHistS, University of Cambridge
 Professor Alison Light, University of Oxford
 Professor Javed Majeed, King's College London
 Professor Roger Matthews, University of Reading
 Professor Robert J. Mayhew, University of Bristol
 Professor Susan Michie, University College London
 Professor Sarah Nettleton, University of York
 Professor Barbara Petrongolo, University of Oxford
 Professor Andrew Pettegree, University of St Andrews
 Professor Dorothy Price, University of Bristol
 Professor Shirin Rai, FAcSS, University of Warwick
 Professor Paul Roberts, University of Nottingham
 Professor Mari Sako, University of Oxford
 Professor Andrew Steptoe, FMedSci, University College London
 Professor Sacha Stern, University College London
 Professor Helen Steward, University of Leeds
 Professor Galin Tihanov, Queen Mary University of London
 Professor Ianthi Tsimpli, University of Cambridge
 Professor Laura Tunbridge, University of Oxford
 Professor Peter Tymms, University of Durham
 Professor Amanda Vickery, Queen Mary University of London.

Corresponding fellows

 Professor Daron Acemoglu, Massachusetts Institute of Technology
 Professor Aleida Assmann, University of Konstanz
 Professor David Avrom Bell, Princeton University
 Professor Sukanta Chaudhuri, Jadavpur University
 Professor Eveline Crone, Leiden University
 Professor Barbara Czarniawska, University of Gothenburg
 Professor John Dillon, Trinity College Dublin
 Professor David Dyzenhaus, University of Toronto
 Professor Katalin É. Kiss, Hungarian Research Center for Linguistics
 Professor Susanna Elm, University of California Berkeley
 Professor Marcella Frangipane, Sapienza University of Rome
 Professor Henry Louis Gates Jr, Harvard University
 Professor Katherine Gibson, Western Sydney University
 Professor Annette Gordon-Reed, Harvard University
 Professor Sergey Ivanov, National Research University, Higher Economic School, Moscow
 Professor Sarah Kenderdine, École polytechnique fédérale de Lausanne
 Professor Philip Kitcher, Columbia University
 Professor Gloria Ladson-Billings, University of Wisconsin-Madison
 Professor Pratap Bhanu Mehta, Princeton University; Centre for Policy Research, New Delhi
 Professor Kobena Mercer, Bard College
 Professor Wanda J. Orlikowski, MIT Sloan School of Management
 Professor Şevket Pamuk, Boğaziçi University, Istanbul
 Professor Adam Przeworski, New York University
 Professor Xinjiang Rong, Peking University
 Professor Gayatri Chakravorty Spivak, Columbia University
 Professor Stefan Vogenauer, Max Planck Institute for Legal History and Legal Theory, Frankfurt
 Professor Elżbieta Witkowska-Zaremba, Institute of Arts, Polish Academy of Sciences
 Professor Brenda Yeoh, National University of Singapore
 Professor Barbie Zelizer, University of Pennsylvania

Honorary fellows

 Professor Simon Armitage CBE, FRSL, University of Leeds
 Baroness Minouche Shafik, London School of Economics and Political Science
 Darren Walker, President of the Ford Foundation

2020
On 24 July 2020, the following were elected to the fellowship; 52 fellows, 30 corresponding fellows, and 4 honorary fellows.

 Fellows

 Anna Sapir Abulafia, University of Oxford
 David Adger, Queen Mary University of London
 Madawi John M. G. Barclayl-Rasheed, London School of Economics
 Charles Baden-Fuller, City University
 John Barclay, Durham University
 Catherine Barnard, University of Cambridge
 Ian Bateman, University of Exeter
 Gurminder Bhambra, University of Sussex
 Michael Billig, University of Loughborough
 Dame Sue Black, Lancaster University
 Amy Bogaard, University of Oxford
 Colin Burrow, University of Oxford
 Martin Carver, University of York
 Martin Clayton, Durham University
 Ursula Coope, University of Oxford
 Giancarlo Corsetti, University of Cambridge
 Patrick Dunleavy, London School of Economics
 Rebecca Earle, University of Warwick
 Khaled Fahmy, University of Cambridge
 Paul Fiddes, University of Oxford
 Regenia Gagnier, University of Exeter
 Mark Harrison, University of Warwick
 Katherine Hawley, University of St Andrews
 Richard Hyman, London School of Economics
 Paula Jarzabkowski, City University
 Judith Jesch, University of Nottingham
 Stathis Kalyvas, University of Oxford
 Daniel Karlin, University of Bristol
 Kieran McEvoy, Queen's University, Belfast
 James Nazroo, University of Manchester
 Polly O'Hanlon, University of Oxford
 Andrew Pettegree, University of St Andrews
 Andrew Pickles, King's College London
 Christopher Pinney, University College London
 Sarah A. Radcliffe, University of Cambridge
 Rick Rawlings, University College London
 Nikolas Rose, King's College London
 Meg Russell, University College London
 James Secord, University of Cambridge
 Constantine Sedikides, University of Southampton
 Simon Shepherd, Central School of Speech and Drama
 Antonella Sorace, University of Edinburgh
 Penny Summerfield, University of Manchester
 Kathy Sylva, University of Oxford (Jesus College)
 Rosalind Thomas, University of Oxford
 Isabel Torres, Queen's University Belfast
 Elaine Unterhalter, University College London
 Caroline van Eck, University of Cambridge
 Essi Viding, University College London
 Timothy Whitmarsh, University of Cambridge
 Andreas Willi, University of Oxford
 Clair Wills, University of Cambridge
 Christopher Woolgar, University of Southampton

 Corresponding fellows

 Elizabeth S. Anderson, University of Michigan
 Nicole Bériou, Institut de Recherche et d'Histoire des Textes
 Homi K. Bhabha, Harvard University
 Bea Cantillon, University of Antwerp
 Kathleen Coleman, Harvard University
 Jonathan Culler, Cornell University
 Anne Cutler, University of Western Sydney
 Joan DeJean, University of Pennsylvania
 Bénédicte Fauvarque-Cosson, Conseillère d'Etat
 Amy Finkelstein, Massachusetts Institute of Technology
 Rainer Forst, Goethe-University
 Jan-Eric Gustafsson, University of Gothenburg
 Alice Harris, University of Massachusetts-Amherst
 Caroline Hoxby, Stanford University
 Sheila Jasanoff, Harvard University
 Geoffrey Jones, Harvard University
 Thomas Kaufmann, University of Göttingen
 Kristian Kristiansen, University of Gothenburg
 Ngaire Naffine, University of Adelaide
 Gülru Necipoğlu, Harvard University
 Charles A. Nelson III, Harvard University
 Jamie Peck, University of British Columbia
 Susan Pedersen, University of Columbia
 Thomas Piketty, Paris School of Economics; EHESS
 Sheldon Pollock, Columbia University
 Walter W. Powell, Stanford University
 Frederick Schauer, University of Virginia Law School
 David Dean Shulman, University Jerusalem
 Kathryn Sikkink, Harvard Kennedy School
 Elliott Sober, University of Wisconsin-Madison

Honorary Fellows

 Robin Jackson CBE, Former Chief Executive of the British Academy
 Bridget Kendall MBE, Journalist, Diplomatic Correspondent, University of Cambridge
 Mary Robinson, Adjunct Professor of Climate Justice and Former President of the Republic of Ireland, Trinity College Dublin
 Gary Younge FAcSS, Professor of Sociology, University of Manchester

References